Imagine Dragons is an American pop rock band from Las Vegas, Nevada, consisting of lead vocalist Dan Reynolds, lead guitarist Wayne Sermon, bassist Ben McKee, and drummer Daniel Platzman. The band is the recipient of a Grammy Award, three American Music Awards, ten Billboard Music Awards, eight BMI Pop Music Awards, an Echo Award, a MTV Video Music Award, five Teen Choice Awards and a World Music Award.

The band's first studio album Night Visions was released in 2012. It debuted at number two on the Billboard 200 and was the fourth best-selling album in the US in 2013 with over 1.4 million copies sold for the year. The album received the 2014 Billboard Music Award for Top Rock Album and was nominated for the Juno Award for International Album of the Year. The second single from the album, "Radioactive", peaked at number three on the US Billboard Hot 100, and peaked at number one on the Billboard Hot Rock Songs. The single received various awards, including the Grammy Award for Best Rock Performance, the Teen Choice Award for Choice Music - Rock Song, the Billboard Music Award for Top Streaming Song (Audio) and was nominated for the MTV Video Music Award for Best Rock Video. During this era MTV called them "the year's biggest breakout band", Billboard named them their "Breakthrough Band of 2013" and placed them at the top of their "Year In Rock" rankings for 2013. Their second studio album, Smoke + Mirrors,  reached number one in the US, Canada and the UK. and sold over one million copies worldwide. The band's third album, Evolve, became their third album to reach the top three on the Billboard 200 and was nominated for the Grammy Award for Best Pop Vocal Album. It spawned the singles, "Believer" and Thunder", which both went on to peak at number four on the Billboard Hot 100 and were nominated at the 2018 Billboard Music Award for Top Selling Song. Their fourth studio album, Origins, released in 2018, peaked at number one in Canada and reached the top ten in the US, Australia and the United Kingdom. The first single from the album, "Natural", peaked at number one on the Billboard Hot Rock Songs. The song received a Nickelodeon Kids' Choice Award nomination for Favorite Song and MTV Video Music Award nomination for Best Rock. 

Imagine Dragons has received several Best Group nominations, including three at the People's Choice Awards, and won two NRJ Music Awards for International Group of the Year, and also was nominated two times at American Music Awards for Artist of the Year. Awarded 5 iHeartRadio Music Awards along with the accomplishment of reaching 1 Billion Total Audience Spins for “Thunder” & “Believer”. The band has received a total of 52 awards and 157 nominations.

Awards and nominations

Notes

References

External links
 Imagine Dragons Official Website
 Imagine Dragons on AllMusic

Awards
Lists of awards received by American musician
Lists of awards received by musical group